Henry Watson Wilder (3 November 1798 – 2 July 1836) was an English first-class cricketer who played in one first-class cricket match in 1817, totalling 12 runs with a highest score of 6. He played for Old Etonians.

References

Bibliography
 

English cricketers
English cricketers of 1787 to 1825
Old Etonians cricketers
1798 births
1836 deaths